Robert Glenn Hubbard (born September 4, 1958) is an American economist and academic. He served as the Dean of the Columbia University Graduate School of Business from 2004 to 2019, where he remains the Russell L. Carson Professor of Finance and Economics. On September 13, 2018, he announced that he would retire from his position after his contract expired on June 30, 2019. Hubbard previously served as Deputy Assistant Secretary at the U.S. Department of the Treasury from 1991 to 1993, and as Chairman of the Council of Economic Advisers from 2001 to 2003.

Hubbard is a visiting scholar at the conservative American Enterprise Institute, where he studies tax policy and health care. He was criticized for his reports and papers on deregulation during the 2008 banking crisis. He was also heavily criticized in the documentary Inside Job about the credit default swap scams that led to the world financial collapse in 2008. He is seen being aggressive towards the reporter when being asked certain questions.

Early life
Born September 4, 1958, Hubbard was raised in Apopka, Florida, a suburb of Orlando, Florida. His father taught at a local community college and his mother taught at a high school. Hubbard's younger brother, Gregg, is a member of the country-pop band Sawyer Brown.

Hubbard is an Eagle Scout. A member of the chess team, he graduated at the top of his class. He scored well enough on his College Level Examination Program to enter the University of Central Florida with enough credits to graduate with two degrees in three years. He obtained his B.A. and B.S. degrees summa cum laude from the University of Central Florida in 1979, and his masters and Ph.D. in economics from Harvard University in 1983.

Career

Academic
Hubbard has been at Columbia University since 1988, being Russell L. Carson Professor of Finance and Economics since 1994.

He was named Dean of Columbia Business School on July 1, 2004. During his tenure, the construction of the 11-story Henry R. Kravis Hall was launched.

Government
Hubbard was Deputy Assistant Secretary at the U.S. Department of the Treasury from 1991 to 1993.

From February 2001 until March 2003, Hubbard was chairman of the Council of Economic Advisors under President George W. Bush. A supply-side economist, he was instrumental in the design of the 2003 Bush Tax cuts.

He was tipped by some media outlets to be a candidate for the position of Chairman of the Federal Reserve when Alan Greenspan retired, although he was not nominated for the position.

Political advisor
Hubbard served as economic advisor to the 2012 presidential campaign of Mitt Romney, a position he also held during Romney's 2008 presidential campaign. In August 2012, Politico identified Hubbard as "a likely Romney appointee as Federal Reserve chairman or Treasury secretary".

Hubbard was an economic advisor for the Jeb Bush 2016 presidential campaign. After Donald Trump became the presumptive Republican nominee, Hubbard was mentioned as a potential Treasury secretary (which eventually went to Steven Mnuchin), and also as a potential Fed chair, a role expected to become open in February 2018. Hubbard had been critical of both Trump and Democratic presidential candidate Hillary Clinton, including after Bush had suspended his campaign. In August 2016, Hubbard declined to say which candidate he supported in the general election, but did say that Trump's taxation plans and their impact on economic growth were in a "direction" somewhat better than Clinton's plans. Hubbard criticized Trump's plans on trade and immigration for their predicted economic impact.

Other
Hubbard serves as co-chair of the Committee on Capital Markets Regulation.

Hubbard is a member of the Board of Directors of Automatic Data Processing, Inc., BlackRock Closed-End Funds, Capmark Financial Corporation, Duke Realty Corporation, KKR Financial Corporation and Ripplewood Holdings. He is also a Director or Trustee of the Economic Club of New York, Tax Foundation, Resources for the Future, Manhattan Council and Fifth Avenue Presbyterian Church, New York, and a member of the Advisory Board of the National Center on Addiction and Substance Abuse... Director of MetLife and Metropolitan Life Insurance Company since February 2007.

Hubbard is currently a board member of:
 Automatic Data Processing
 Duke Realty
 Ripplewood Holdings
 MetLife Inc.
 FiscalNote

On January 8, 2019, he was appointed to become MetLife's non-executive chairman of the board as of May 1, 2019, upon the retirement of Steven A. Kandarian.

Inside Job interview and aftermath
Hubbard was interviewed in Charles Ferguson's Oscar-winning documentary film, Inside Job (2010), discussing his advocacy, as chief economic advisor to the Bush Administration, of deregulation. Ferguson argues that deregulation led to the 2008 international banking crisis sparked by the collapse of Lehman Brothers and the sale of Merrill Lynch. In the interview, Ferguson asks Hubbard to enumerate the firms from whom he receives outside income as an advisory board member in the context of possible conflict of interest. Hubbard, hitherto cooperative, declines to answer and threatens to end the interview with the remark, "You have three more minutes; give it your best shot." After the release of the film, Columbia ramped up ongoing efforts to strengthen and clarify their conflict of interest disclosure requirements. (Columbia Business School professor Michael Feiner, a member of the faculty committee of Columbia's Sanford C. Bernstein and Co. Center for Leadership and Ethics, has recommended that the film be shown to all business school students.)

Books

Hubbard is the author of a number of economic and socioeconomic texts, with a focus on deregulation, conservative fiscal policy and taxation. In 2009, he wrote and published The Aid Trap with economist William Duggan Columbia University Press, criticizing the aid system provided by NGOs in western countries as preventing internal growth in poorer nations. In 2013, he published Balance with former intelligence officer and economist Tim Kane.

Columbia Business School (CBS) Follies
Hubbard is also frequently featured in skits by Columbia Business School's "Follies" group, ranging from videos of him monitoring students on classroom video cameras to songs about his relationship with Presidential candidate Mitt Romney. Hubbard has also publicized his dissatisfaction with Ben Bernanke's nomination as Chair of the Federal Reserve with his comedic YouTube parody of The Police's "Every Breath You Take", titled "Every Breath Bernanke Takes".

References

External links
 Faculty page at Columbia University
 Scholar page at the American Enterprise Institute
 
 Election Central Guide to 2008
 Inside Job – Documentary Site at Sony.com
 Personal Website and Archive

|-

1958 births
American Presbyterians
Business school deans
Columbia Business School faculty
Florida Republicans
George W. Bush administration personnel
Harvard Graduate School of Arts and Sciences alumni
Living people
People from Apopka, Florida
People from Orlando, Florida
Supply-side economists
University of Central Florida alumni
National Bureau of Economic Research
Economists from Florida
21st-century American economists
Chairs of the United States Council of Economic Advisers
MetLife people